was an Estonian comedy act, made up of Hannes Võrno, Peeter Oja and Tarmo Leinatamm.

They have been around since 1993 with radio and TV sketch shows. Their sketches have introduced the hazardous sport of stoneball, the character of the arrogant man with a flat hat and that of Alev Ström, the Estonian immigrant in Sweden talking nonsense Swedish much in the same way that their Eurovision Song Contest 2008 submission "Leto svet" (Summer Light) uses nonsense Serbian (along with Finnish and German).

Tarmo Leinatamm died on October 13, 2014.

See also
Estonia in the Eurovision Song Contest 2008

References

External links

Kreisiraadio in Internet Movie Database

Eurovision Song Contest entrants for Estonia
Eurovision Song Contest entrants of 2008
Estonian comedians
Performing groups established in 1993
1993 establishments in Estonia
Comedy collectives